Carlos Quiney (1937–2007) was a Spanish film actor.

Selected filmography

 Hell Commandos (1969)
Zorro's Latest Adventure (1969) 
 Bullets Over Dallas (1970)
 Scream of the Demon Lover (1970)
 More Dollars for the MacGregors (1970)
 Zorro, Rider of Vengeance (1971) 
 Zorro the Invincible (1971)
 Pirates of Blood Island (1972)
 Dracula, the Terror of the Living Dead (1973)

References

Bibliography
 Pitts, Michael R. Western Movies: A Guide to 5,105 Feature Films. McFarland, 2012.

External links

1937 births
2007 deaths
Spanish male film actors
People from Las Palmas